Cartin–Snyder–Overacker Farmstead is a historic farm located at Melrose, Rensselaer County, New York. The farmstead includes a number of contributing outbuildings.  The farmhouse was built in 1974 to replace one burned that year.  The contributing resources include the outhouse (c. 1900), garage (c. 1920s), ice house (c. 1900), milk house (c. 1920s), chicken house (c. 1920s), threshing barn (c. 1810), tool barn (c. 1810), horse barn (c. 1840-1860), and rabbit house (c. 1940).

It was listed on the National Register of Historic Places in 2013.

References

Farms on the National Register of Historic Places in New York (state)
1800 establishments in New York (state)
Buildings and structures in Rensselaer County, New York
National Register of Historic Places in Rensselaer County, New York